Sonia Pressman Fuentes (born May 30, 1928 in Berlin, Germany) is a German American author, speaker, feminist leader, and lawyer.

Early years and education
Fuentes was born in Berlin, Germany, of Polish parents, with whom she came to the U.S. to escape the Holocaust. She graduated from Cornell University and the University of Miami School of Law.

Career
In the U.S., she became one of the founders of the second wave of the women's movement. She was a co-founder of the National Organization for Women (NOW) and Federally Employed Women (FEW), and she was one of the first woman lawyers in the Equal Employment Opportunity Commission (EEOC).  She contributed to several early sexual discrimination cases by connecting complainants with feminist lawyers outside the EEOC.

Fuentes is the author of a memoir, Eat First—You Don't Know What They'll Give You, The Adventures of an Immigrant Family and Their Feminist Daughter (1999), which has been required reading at Cornell University and American University in Washington, D.C. Her articles on women's rights and other subjects have been published in newspapers, magazines, and journals in the U.S. and other countries.

Fuentes has given talks throughout the U.S. as well as in Germany, Spain, Japan, China, the Philippines, Singapore, Indonesia, and Thailand. She has served as an "American specialist" on women's rights for the then-U.S. Information Agency.

She is a member of the Maryland Women's Hall of Fame. Since 1994 Fuentes has been a resident of Sarasota, Florida as a snowbird and permanently, since 2009.

Her papers are archived in the Schlesinger Library at Harvard University.

Awards
Foremother Award from the National Center for Health Research.

References

Bibliography

Further reading

External links 
 Official website
 Sonja Pressman Fuentes at the Jewish Women's Archive

1928 births
Living people
20th-century American writers
20th-century American women writers
Jewish American writers
American women lawyers
American lawyers
National Organization for Women people
People from Sarasota, Florida
Jewish women writers
American people of Polish descent
Cornell University alumni
University of Miami School of Law alumni
German emigrants to the United States
21st-century American Jews
21st-century American women